The 1962 Society of Film and Television Arts Television Awards, the United Kingdom's premier television awards ceremony. The awards later became known as the British Academy Television Awards, under which name they are still given.

Winners
Actor 
Rupert Davies
Actress 
Ruth Dunning
Current Events
Bill Allenby
Designer 
Voytek
Desmond Davis Award for Services to Television
Michael Barry
Drama Production
Andrew Osborn
Factual
Tim Hewat
Light Entertainment (Artist)
Eric Sykes
Light Entertainment
George Inns
Special Award
David Attenborough

References

External links
http://awards.bafta.org/1962

British Academy Film Awards
1962 in the United Kingdom
1962 television awards
1962 in British television